Idiothauma is a genus of moths belonging to the family Tortricidae.

Species
Idiothauma africanum  Walsingham, 1897
Idiothauma malgassicella  Viette, 1958
Idiothauma rigatiella  Ghesquire, 1940

References

External links
tortricidae.com

Hilarographini
Tortricidae genera
Taxa named by Thomas de Grey, 6th Baron Walsingham